In botany, sessility (meaning "sitting", used in the sense of "resting on the surface") is a characteristic of plant parts (such as flowers and leaves) that have no stalk. Plant parts can also be described as subsessile, that is, not completely sessile.

A sessile flower is one that lacks a pedicel (flower stalk). A flower that is not sessile is pedicellate. For example, the genus Trillium is partitioned into two subgenera, the sessile-flowered trilliums (Trillium subg. Sessilium) and the pedicellate-flowered trilliums.

Sessile leaves lack petioles (leaf stalks). A leaf that is not sessile is petiolate. For example, the leaves of most monocotyledons lack petioles.

The term sessility is also used in mycology to describe a fungal fruit body that is attached to or seated directly on the surface of the substrate, lacking a supporting stipe or pedicel.

References

Plant morphology
Fungal morphology and anatomy